The Minardi M193 was a Formula One car designed by Aldo Costa and Gustav Brunner and built by Minardi for the 1993 Formula One season. The car was powered by the Ford HBD V8 engine and ran on Goodyear tyres. Drivers of the car included Christian Fittipaldi (who flipped his car when he collided with teammate Pierluigi Martini at the finish of the Italian Grand Prix), Martini and former Ferrari driver and 5 time grand prix winner Michele Alboreto.

Using the M193, Minardi scored 7 points to finish 8th in the 1993 Constructors' Championship.

Minardi M193B

An updated version of the car, the M193B, was used for the 1994 season, until the 1994 Canadian Grand Prix, when the Minardi M194 was introduced. Pierluigi Martini and Michele Alboreto were retained for the season but between them could only score 5 points for 10th in the Constructors' Championship.

Livery 
The M193 had a major change in its colour scheme, compared to its predecessor. The predominantly black paintjob was replaced by a white car with minor black and yellow painting on the front and rear wings. New driver Fabrizio Barbazza brought along the Italian company Beta Tools as Minardi's main sponsor.

The 1994 livery reflected the team's merger with Scuderia Italia. Light blue and orange became the car's primary colour scheme, due to sponsorship from Lucchini and Beta Tools, respectively.

Race results
(key)

* 2 points scored in  using Minardi M194

References

1993 Formula One season cars
1994 Formula One season cars
Minardi Formula One cars